Melia is a family name that may originate in the Caucasus state of Georgia (Georgian: მელია), in Italy, or in Ireland. Melia Bergamin. The Georgian name is believed to be derived from the word melia (sometimes mela), meaning "fox". Names derived from Melia are Meliava, Meliva, Melua, Meluava or Meladze. The Italian history may date back to early Rome. The Irish origins may be via alterations to the name O'Maille or O'Malley.

Notable people with the surname Melia or Meliá include:

 Aoife Melia, Irish medical doctor
 Careena Melia, Irish-American actress
 Cian Melia, Irish showjumper
 Elie Melia (1915–1988), lived in Belgium and then in France; priest and historian of the Georgian Orthodox Church
 Fulvio Melia (b. 1956), Italian-American astrophysicist, cosmologist and author
 Jimmy Melia (born 1937), English footballer
 Joe Melia (1935–2012), British television and film actor
 Leslie Melia (1929–1997), Canadian sprint canoer at the 1956 Olympics
 Michael Melia (b. 1945), British actor
 Nika Melia (born 1979), Georgian politician
 Pius Melia (1800–1883), Italian Jesuit theologian
 Salome Melia (born 1987), Georgian chess player
 Salvador Meliá (born 1977), Spanish track cyclist at the 2000 and 2004 Olympics
 Thomas O. Melia (born 1957), American advocate for human rights and democracy
 Tim Melia (b. 1986), American soccer player

See also
 Melua, a surname

References

Georgian-language surnames